"I Won't Be Home for Christmas" is a song by American rock band Blink-182. The song was originally recorded and released as a radio promo in 1997. MCA Records reissued it internationally as a single on October 16, 2001. The song was recorded with original drummer Scott Raynor and produced by Mark Trombino, who produced the trio's second studio album, Dude Ranch (1997). The song's title is a parody of the Christmas song "I'll Be Home for Christmas".

The single topped the Canadian Singles Chart, but it did not chart anywhere else. It remained at that position for three weeks in 2001 and for two weeks in 2002. It is the band's sole Canadian number one.

Background
The song was originally recorded in 1997 for KROQ. The song was later included on A Santa Cause: It's a Punk Rock Christmas (2003), a Christmas-themed compilation by Immortal Records.

The song’s narrative follows a man "snapping" on Christmas Eve and attacking a group of carolers. MSN Canada called the song "a high-energy punk war on Christmas".

Reception

Chart performance
The song peaked at number one in Canada. The song remained at the top of the charts for five non-consecutive weeks.

Track listings

Personnel
Blink-182
 Mark Hoppus – vocals, bass guitar 
 Tom DeLonge – vocals, guitar 
 Scott Raynor – drums 
 Travis Barker – drums

Charts

Weekly charts

Year-end charts

References

1997 singles
1997 songs
2001 singles
American Christmas songs
Blink-182 songs
Canadian Singles Chart number-one singles
Songs written by Mark Hoppus
Songs written by Tom DeLonge